Sarpreet Singh (born 20 February 1999) is a New Zealand professional footballer who plays as an attacking midfielder for  club Jahn Regensburg, on loan from Bayern Munich II. He also represents the New Zealand national team.

Born in New Zealand to Indian parents, Singh played for Onehunga Sports in his youth before signing for Wellington Phoenix Academy in 2015, then making his competitive senior debut for the Wellington Phoenix in 2016. He spent another three seasons with the club becoming a regular starter and earned his first international call up for New Zealand in 2018 to play at the Intercontinental Cup, where he scored his first international goal.

After impressive performances with the New Zealand national under-20 football team at the 2019 FIFA U-20 World Cup, Singh signed a three-year deal with Bayern Munich. Singh's first appearance for the senior team was in a friendly against Arsenal at the 2019 International Champions Cup.

Club career

Early career
Born in Auckland, New Zealand, Singh grew up playing for local club Onehunga Sports under the tutelage of long-term mentor Hiroshi Miyazawa. At the age of ten, Singh represented Auckland at the Australian National Futsal Championships, winning the most valuable player award and attracting interest from Premier League side Everton.

Wellington Phoenix
Singh joined the Wellington Phoenix Academy in early 2015 after impressing then-Phoenix coach Ernie Merrick, while playing for the New Zealand under-17 side at the OFC U-17 Championship. He was one of two players to receive a footballing scholarship to Scots College from New Zealand international Winston Reid.

Singh began his senior footballing career later that year, being placed into Wellington's reserve team in the New Zealand Football Championship at the age of 16. Singh made twelve appearances that season, with his season being marked by a call-up to the senior Wellington Phoenix squad for an A-League match against Perth Glory on 7 February 2016, where he remained an unused substitute. A year later, following much individual success for the reserves, Singh made his competitive debut in the A-League as a substitute in a 1–5 loss to Melbourne City on 18 February 2017. On 1 June 2017, Singh signed his first senior contract, penning a three-year deal with Wellington Phoenix.

Singh gained a consistent role in the Wellington Phoenix first team midway through the 2017–18 A-League season, making a series of substitute appearances under Darije Kalezić. Following a minor injury to Goran Paracki, Singh was named in the starting lineup for the first time on 17 February 2018 against Perth Glory. He marked his starting debut for the club with a long-range goal within three minutes in a 2–1 victory. Following this performance, Singh was promised a prolonged run in the starting eleven by Kalezić, and became a regular starter for the club; after two goals on the final matchday against Melbourne City, Singh finished the season as the second-highest goalscorer at the club behind Andrija Kaluđerović, despite only playing eleven games.

Singh carried his form into the 2018–19 season, becoming an undisputed starter under new coach Mark Rudan playing 26 games, scoring five goals and registering a team-high eight assists. Following a breakout performance in a 4–1 win over Brisbane Roar on 22 December 2018, in which Singh scored from a free kick and assisted a David Williams goal, he was described by critic Mark Bosnich as "the best player in the A-League right now at this moment in time".

Bayern Munich
After impressing Bayern scouts while playing for New Zealand at the 2019 FIFA U-20 World Cup, it was announced on 1 July 2019 Singh had signed a three-year deal with Bayern Munich for an undisclosed fee, believed to be between the figures of NZD $750,000 and $1,000,000. He was immediately assigned to their reserve team, Bayern Munich II, who play in the 3. Liga.

Singh made his friendly debut for the reserve side on 6 July 2019, assisting the opening goal as Bayern Munich II overcame FC Liefering 2–1. Singh made an appearance for the senior team eleven days later, playing the second half in a 2–1 friendly defeat to Arsenal in the 2019 International Champions Cup, and again in the other two tournament games against Real Madrid and AC Milan. Singh started his first game for Bayern Munich on 31 July, playing the full match and scoring in a penalty shoot-out loss to Tottenham Hotspur in the 2019 Audi Cup final. Singh's performance in the pre-season impressed Bayern Munich's coach Niko Kovač; on 3 August, he was called up for a 2–0 loss against Borussia Dortmund in the DFL Supercup, but was an unused substitute.

Singh scored his first goal for Bayern Munich II against Unterhaching in a 1–2 loss.

After impressing in the reserves with five goals and four assists, Singh was promoted to train with the first team until the end of the winter break by interim coach Hansi Flick. He subsequently made his Bundesliga debut for the senior team on 14 December 2019, coming on as a substitute for Philippe Coutinho in a 6–1 win over Werder Bremen. Singh became the first New Zealander to play in the Bundesliga since Oceania Footballer of the Century Wynton Rufer, who previously played for Werder Bremen.

Singh made his first start for Bayern Munich on 20 June 2020 against SC Freiburg after the club had secured the Bundesliga title.

1. FC Nürnberg (loan)
On 7 August 2020, Singh joined 2. Bundesliga side 1. FC Nürnberg on a season-long loan. Singh had his first start for the club, playing 63 minutes for the team in their 0–3 lost to RB Leipzig in the DFB-Pokal. He made his first league start for the club against Jahn Regensburg on 19 September 2020. After playing a dozen games for Nürnberg of which he started six times, Singh cut his loan short and returned to Bayern Munich.

Jahn Regensburg (loan)
On 6 July 2021, Singh joined 2. Bundesliga side SSV Jahn Regensburg on a season-long loan. The loan was renewed for the 2022–23 season.

International career
Singh's first international appearances for New Zealand came at under-17 level, being named to the 20-man squad for the 2015 OFC U-17 Championship.

Singh competed for New Zealand at the 2017 FIFA U-20 World Cup, being knocked out by the United States in the round of 16. Singh also appeared for New Zealand in the 2019 FIFA U-20 World Cup, being knocked out by Colombia in the round of 16 via penalty shootout following a 1–1 draw after extra time.

Singh earned his first senior national team call-up for a friendly match against Canada on 24 March in Murcia. He was substituted on in the second half of a 1–0 loss. Sarpreet scored his first goal for New Zealand on 2 June 2018, against Kenya in the 2018 Intercontinental Cup. In the same tournament, he provided both assists as his team defeated India 2–1.

Style of play
Solely appearing as an attacking midfielder for the Wellington Phoenix but often deployed as a deep-lying playmaker or winger for Bayern Munich II, the left-footed Singh acted as primary playmaker for the Phoenix under Mark Rudan during the 2018–19 A-League season. With a nimble gait and quick turn of pace, alongside exceptional vision and creativity for his age, Singh has earned comparisons to German attacking midfielder Mesut Özil.

Personal life
Singh was born in Auckland and is of Indian descent. While at Bayern, Singh has been taking German lessons twice a week.

Career statistics

Club

International goals
Scores and results list New Zealand's goal tally first, score column indicates score after each Singh goal.

Honours
Bayern Munich
 Bundesliga: 2019–20
 DFB-Pokal: 2019–20

Bayern Munich II
 3. Liga: 2019–20

New Zealand U17
OFC U-17 Championship: 2015

New Zealand U20
OFC U-20 Championship: 2016

References

External links

 

1999 births
Living people
New Zealand sportspeople of Indian descent
New Zealand people of Punjabi descent
New Zealand association footballers
Association football midfielders
Wellington Phoenix FC players
FC Bayern Munich footballers
FC Bayern Munich II players
1. FC Nürnberg players
SSV Jahn Regensburg players
A-League Men players
Bundesliga players
3. Liga players
2. Bundesliga players
New Zealand international footballers
New Zealand expatriate association footballers
New Zealand expatriate sportspeople in Germany
Expatriate footballers in Germany
New Zealand under-20 international footballers